Chlidichthys cacatuoides, the cockatoo dottyback, is a species of fish in the family Pseudochromidae.

Description

Distribution and habitat
Chlidichthys cacatuoides is found in the Indian Ocean from Oman including the Socotra Archipelago.

References

Pseudoplesiopinae
Taxa named by Anthony C. Gill
Taxa named by John Ernest Randall
Fish described in 1994